The Leonidaion (Λεωνίδαιον) was the lodging place for athletes taking part in the Olympic Games at Olympia. It was located at the southwest edge of the sanctuary and was the largest building on the site. It was constructed around 330 BCE and was funded and designed by Leonidas of Naxos.

The building consisted of four Ionian colonnades with 138 decorated columns, forming a square of approximately 80 metres. In its interior there was a central Doric peristyle with 44 columns.

In the late third century AD the still utilised Leonidaion was destroyed in an earthquake and its wreckage used in the construction of the Late Antique wall built to protect the site from the Herules.

External links

Ancient Greek buildings and structures
Ancient Olympia